Amadeus VI (4 January 1334 – 1 March 1383), nicknamed the Green Count was Count of Savoy from 1343 to 1383. He was the eldest son of Aymon, Count of Savoy, and Yolande Palaeologina of Montferrat.  Though he started under a regency, he showed himself to be a forceful leader, continuing Savoy's emergence as a power in Europe politically and militarily.  He participated in a crusade against the Turks who were moving into Europe.

Early years
When his father died in 1343, Amadeus inherited the County of Savoy.  Since he was only nine years old, his father's will left two cousins as co-regents: Amadeus III of Geneva and Louis II of Vaud.  The two agreed to a document limiting their power as regents.  Neither could make any significant decision without the other, and the decisions of both were subject to review by the resident council of nobles representing all bailis in the county.

Shortly after Amadeus took the county, his cousin Joan of Savoy renewed her claim on the county of Savoy, that she was descended from Amadeus's uncle Edward, Count of Savoy, though her claim had previously been denied under Savoy's Semi-Salic tradition.  Though she died the following year, in her will she left the county to Philip, Duke of Orléans to spite her cousins.  In 1345, he negotiated a similar settlement to the one Joan reached with Aymon, yielding the claim in exchange for 5000 livres annually.

Amadeus was educated both physically and mentally.  He enjoyed learning to fight and ride.  His education included classic works such as De Re Militari and more modern texts including De Regimine Principum.  He also showed religious devotion, requesting a portable altar and the right for his chaplain to say mass for him every morning wherever he may be.  He took vows to fast more often than was healthy for him, and then asked Pope Clement VI to release him from these vows.  The pope agreed, asking him instead to feed twelve of the poor weekly.

When the young Angevin queen Joanna I of Naples took the throne, several in northern Italy sought to take advantage of her inexperience and seize her lands there.  John II, Marquess of Montferrat led the first attacks, while James of Piedmont, a cousin and vassal of Amadeus, backed the queen.  After her first army was defeated in 1345, the attackers moved next into the territory ruled by James.  In 1347, James asked Amadeus for help, and Amadeus sent an army.  That army swept the attackers back through July of that year, with Amadeus joining the fighting in the last few weeks.  John then recruited the help of Humbert II, Dauphin of Viennois, an old enemy of the Savoyards, and Thomas II, Marquess of Saluzzo.  Together, they conquered the Angevin lands.  Pope Clement VI spent 1348 negotiating a truce to end the fighting, which none of the combatants were satisfied with.

From 1348 through 1351, the Black Death ravaged the lands of Savoy, halving the population in some villages.  In 1348, many of the peasants thought that it was caused by Jews poisoning wells and fountains.  Though the castellans in some places tried to protect them, quite a few were killed.  In Chambéry, the Jews were locked in the castle for their protection, but a mob broke in and killed several.  Court officers were then pressured into finding the remainder guilty of poisoning, executing eleven and charging the remainder a fine of 160 florins per month for the next six years.

In 1349, Amadeus agreed to a treaty between himself, Amadeus of Geneva, James of Piedmont, and the House of Visconti, rulers of Milan, for mutual defence and assistance.  This treaty included provisions for Galeazzo II Visconti to marry Bianca of Savoy, sister of the count.  To honor the marriage in 1350, Amadeus created the Order of the Black Swan.

In 1349 Humbert II de La Tour du Pin, Dauphin de Viennois, the last Dauphin de Viennois, surrendered his title and principality to the future Charles V of France. At the time the new Dauphin was grandson of the current King Philip VI of France and son to his heir apparent, the later John II of France. Humbert II retired into a Dominican monastery.

Count of Savoy
In 1350, Guichard Tavel, the bishop of Sion and an ally of Savoy attempted to take the rights of some nobles in Valais, a frontier of Savoy.  He and his staff were attacked in August 1351.  Pope Clement VI excommunicated the rebels, and Amadeus sent in thirty knights.  Eight thousand peasants rose up in response and captured a couple of castles.  One hundred knights were sent in, and pushed the rebels back.  In March 1352, Amadeus assembled an army, including Amadeus of Geneva and John of Montferrat, and the count swept through the valley in April.  The rebels yielded quickly, and Amadeus re-established the authority over Sion that his uncle Edward had lost.

In the summer of 1352, Hugh of Geneva, uncle of Amadeus of Geneva and a noble within the Dauphiné re-ignited the long-standing feud with Savoy.  The count of Savoy insulted Amadeus of Geneva's honor related to the treaty he had negotiated between Savoy and the Dauphiné, and so Amadeus of Geneva left the council, and challenged one of the other William de la Baume, who had replaced Louis of Vaud on the council.  On 6 Jun 1352, the count of Savoy made an alliance with Albert II, Duke of Austria for mutual aid in conflict.  Amadeus of Savoy gathered an army from his Italian lands to bring to war.  As they were crossing the Alps, the rebellion in Valais and Sion broke out anew.  Amadeus turned his army there first, and on 3 November defeated the rebels soundly.  On the morning of the fourth, his advisor William knighted him.  He then had part of the wall of Sion torn down, and his army pillaged the city.  He also fined the citizens heavily.

He earned the nickname the Green Count when, in celebration of his 19th birthday, he appeared in a series of tournaments dressed with green plumes upon his helm, a green silk tabard over his armor, and his horse bearing green caparisons. He entered with an escort of eleven knights dressed in green, each led by a lady also dressed in green, leading her knight's steed with a green cord.  From then on, green was the favorite color for his clothes and for his court.

In the spring of 1353, Amadeus prepared his army to attack the Dauphiné.  John II of France intervened and settled a truce in July, as he was hoping to use both armies in Gascony against the English, continuing the Hundred Years' War.  However, Hugh immediately broke the truce.  Amadeus besieged Hugh's forces in Gex from 26 October through 11 November, when Amadeus defeated and burned the city.  Pope Innocent VI and John both sent delegations to negotiate a truce, but Amadeus and Hugh continued their fight until April 1354.  The fighting ended then when Amadeus destroyed Hugh's army near Les Abrets.

In a treaty concluded in Paris in 1355, Amadeus agreed to exchange territory in Dauphiné beyond the rivers Rhone and Guiers, in exchange for recognition as the undisputed sovereign of Faucigny and the county of Gex, as well as becoming the suzerain lord over the Counts of Genevois, all of whose titles had been the subject of earlier contention between the Counts of Savoy and the Dauphins of Viennois. Amadeus also forced the Marquess of Saluzzo to pay him tribute, thus extending his rule to the Italian side of the Alps.

Amadeus was credited with purchasing the territory of the mountain pass, the Col de Largentièes, today Maddalena Pass on the border of France and Italy, for the sum of 60,000 ecus. The Col de Largentière was of great strategic and commercial importance because it linked Lyon with Italy; it offered an easy route between Piedmont and the outlying valley of Barcelonnette, which came into Savoyard possession when Amadeus or his heir transferred it from the County of Provence to the County of Nice.

This made him an important player in the politics of Northern Italy. The Republic of Genoa and the Republic of Venice had for long argued over the ownership of the island of Tenedos in the Aegean Sea. Eventually it was agreed that the Island should be entrusted to the Count of Savoy.

Crusade

Amadeus initiated a minor crusade (with 15 ships and 1,700 men) in 1366 against Murad I of the Ottoman Empire to aid his cousin, John V Palaiologos, the Byzantine Emperor, son of the Dowager Empress, Anne of Savoy. On this campaign Amadeus joined forces with Francesco I of Lesbos, and Hungarian king Louis the Great, and they drove the Turks from Gallipoli.  (This victory was short-lived, though, for they lost Gallipoli to the Turkish Sultan Murad I a few years later.) At this time John V was held captive by the Bulgarians.  Amadeus turned his forces against Bulgaria and captured the Black Sea ports of Mesembria and Sozopolis.  He then laid siege to Varna and sent Tsar Ivan Alexander an ultimatum to release John V or suffer further defeat.  Ivan Alexander released John V and Amadeus returned to spend the winter in Mesembria, arriving there with John V before Christmas.

Later years
From 1372 to 1373 he fought alongside Enguerrand VII, Lord of Coucy in Italy as a part of the Papal forces against the Visconti family.

In 1377, he ordered the installation of the first public mechanical clock in the region, and established an officer to maintain it.  He created a system of state-supported poor relief, one of the first of its kind in the late medieval world.

In 1381 at Turin, he mediated between Genoa and Venice and sponsored the peace treaty which brought an end to the War of Chioggia and the larger Venetian-Genoese War.  Later Amadeus would be persuaded by Antipope Clement VII to accompany Louis I, Duke of Anjou, on an expedition to Naples. Here in 1382 the Count would share with Louis in the successful conquests of Abruzzi and Apulia. He died at Campobasso in 1383.

Marriage and children
Throughout his youth, negotiations took place for him to marry a royal bride.  In 1338, he was engaged to Margaret of Bohemia, three-year-old daughter of Charles IV, Holy Roman Emperor.  From 1340 to 1344, he was betrothed to Joanna of Bourbon, niece of Philip VI of France.  This marriage would have come with a dowry of fifty thousand florins.  In 1347, he renounced that engagement, and became engaged instead to Joan of Burgundy, daughter of Philip of Burgundy and Joan I, Countess of Auvergne.  This would have placed Amadeus as heir to her brother, Philip I, Duke of Burgundy.  The three-year-old heiress was brought to the court of Savoy to be raised.  In the summer of 1351, Amadeus sent to Edward III of England, seeking to marry his daughter, Isabella.  This petition was protested by Amadeus of Geneva.  Joan remained at the court until 18 Apr 1355, when she was sent to a convent in Poissy to live out her life.

He was married in 1355 in Paris to Bonne of Bourbon, the sister-in-law of Charles V of France. They had three children:
daughter, born 1358 died after a few weeks
Amadeus VII (March 1360 – 1 November 1391). He married Bonne of Berry (1365–1435), daughter of Duke John of Berry and a niece of Bonne of Bourbon.
Louis of Savoy, born late 1364, died before the end of the year

In Literature
Amadeus is one of the main characters in the New Weird novel La luce di Orione (2007) by Valerio Evangelisti. He is also a supporting character in the Chivalry series by Christian Cameron, with his epithet providing the title of the third novel, The Green Count (2017).

Notes

References
 
 
 
 
 
 

1334 births
1383 deaths
14th-century Counts of Savoy
People from Chambéry
People of the Byzantine–Ottoman wars
Burials at Hautecombe Abbey